Chionodes sattleri is a moth in the family Gelechiidae. It is found in North America, where it has been recorded from Newfoundland, from Nova Scotia to British Columbia to Yukon and Alaska, as well as in Indiana, Maine, Michigan, Minnesota, Montana, New Hampshire, Wyoming and Colorado.

References

Chionodes
Moths described in 1999
Moths of North America